Wells Ridge is a rocky ridge 4 nautical miles (7 km) long between the Swanson Mountains and Mount Gilmour in the Ford Ranges, Marie Byrd Land. Discovered on aerial flights made from the West Base of the United States Antarctic Service (USAS) (1939–41) and named for Loran Wells, photographer and observer with the USAS geology party which visited this ridge in 1940.

References

Ridges of Marie Byrd Land